Phyllops vetus is an extinct relative of the Cuban fig-eating bat. Its remains have been found on Cuba and Isle of Pines.

P. vetus was smaller than its living relative. Recent discoveries in Cuba suggest that it survived into the Late Quaternary, perhaps as recently as 2,000 years ago.

References

Prehistoric bats
Holocene extinctions
Fossils of Cuba
Phyllostomidae